The Tatoosh fire began in Washington on August 22, 2006.  It was sparked by lightning and in September 2006, it moved across the border into British Columbia.  As of September 10, 2006, it was still out of control and burning in E. C. Manning Provincial Park. At that time, it had already burned 4,000 hectares before rain finally brought the fire season to an end. The fire ultimately burned  in Washington and British Columbia, and the overall Tatoosh Complex burned .

References

External links
CBC News Report

Okanogan County, Washington
2006 08 22
2006 wildfires
2006 in Washington (state)
2006 08 22
2006 in British Columbia
Natural disasters in British Columbia

2006 disasters in Canada